Raymond William Frankowski (September 14, 1919 – November 27, 2001) was a guard in the US National Football League.

Biography
Frankowski was born on September 14, 1919 in Chicago, Illinois, United States.

Career
Frankowski was drafted by the Green Bay Packers in the third round of the 1942 NFL Draft and played that season with the team. Following his time with the Packers, he would play three seasons with the Los Angeles Dons of the All-America Football Conference.

He played at the collegiate level at the University of Washington, where he was a two-time member of the All-America team and a member of the school's fencing and wrestling teams.

See also
List of Green Bay Packers players

References

External links

1919 births
2001 deaths
All-American college football players
American football guards
Green Bay Packers players
Los Angeles Dons players
Washington Huskies football players
Players of American football from Chicago